is a former Japanese football player.

Career
Matsumoto made his professional debut against Matsumoto Yamaga FC on 12 May 2013, when he came on as a substitute for Kim Dong-hee in the 46th minute.

References

External links

 

1990 births
Living people
Senshu University alumni
Association football people from Shizuoka Prefecture
Japanese footballers
J2 League players
Ococias Kyoto AC players
Giravanz Kitakyushu players
Association football defenders